is a 1980 Japanese war drama film, directed by Tengo Yamada. It is the third installment in the Barefoot Gen live-action film series.

Plot

Cast
 Jun Harada as "Gen Nakaoka", Barefoot Gen, the protagonist of the story
 Mizuho Suzuki as "Daikichi Nakaoka", Gen's father
 Satomi Oka as "Kimie Nakaoka", Gen's mother
 Kenichi Sakuragi as "Koji Nakaoka", Gen's eldest brother
 Yasufumi Hayashi as "Ryuta"
 Jun Fubuki as "Sumiko Nomura"
 Daigo Kusano as "Oba"
 Rinichi Yamamoto as "Okauchi-kumi-cho"
 Ichiro Zaitsu as "Boku-san"
 Akira Nishikino as "Nakayama-sho-sa"
 Shinya Ono as "Kimai-sho-sa"
 Eishin Tono as "Tamikichi"

See also
 Barefoot Gen
 Barefoot Gen, 1976 film
 Barefoot Gen (anime)
 Barefoot Gen (TV drama)
 Grave of the Fireflies

External links
 

1980 films
Films about the atomic bombings of Hiroshima and Nagasaki
Historical anime and manga
1980s Japanese-language films
1980s war drama films
Film
Films set in Hiroshima
Films shot in Hiroshima
Japanese war drama films
1980 drama films
Japanese World War II films
1980s Japanese films
Live-action films based on manga

ja:はだしのゲン#実写映画